Litoměřice is a town in the Ústí nad Labem Region of the Czech Republic. It has about 23,000 inhabitants. The town centre is well preserved and is protected by law as an urban monument reservation.

The town is the seat of the Roman Catholic Diocese of Litoměřice.

Administrative parts

Litoměřice is made up of four town parts: Litoměřice-Město, Pokratice, Předměstí and Za nemocnicí.

Geography
The northwestern half of the municipal territory lies in the Central Bohemian Uplands, the southeastern half lies in the Lower Eger Table, on the edge of the Polabí lowlands. The town is situated on the right (northern) bank of the Elbe River, at its confluence with the Ohře, which flows from the south.

History

Early history
The settlement of Litoměřice has a deep history of Paleolithic cultures as well as large Celtic settlements of the La Tène culture, which did not survive the incoming Germanic attacks. The area was later settled by Germanic tribes, when Litoměřice first appeared on Ptolemy's world map in the 2nd century under the name of Nomisterium. The Germanic tribes later migrated west and those remaining mingled with the incoming Slavs. The earliest evidence of the Slavic settlement comes from the 8th century.

In the 9th and 10th century, Litoměřice fell under the control of the Přemyslid dynasty. Přemyslids built here an early medieval fortress, one of the most important Přemyslid centres in Czech lands. The area was settled by the Czech tribe of Litoměřici, after which the town was named. In 1057, the Litomeřice Chapter was founded by Duke Spytihněv II, and it is the oldest written evidence of the existence of the town.

A royal-town statute was granted in 1219 by King Ottokar I of Bohemia. At the beginning of the 13th century, Litoměřice was an important political, cultural and economic centre.

15th–19th centuries
The population suffered during the 15th century Hussite Wars. After the Protestant tensions with the Catholics that triggered the Thirty Years' War and the Protestants' defeat in the Battle of White Mountain, the surviving population of the town was forced to accept Catholicism or face property confiscation and the obligation to leave the kingdom. In this way, the town became a Catholic bishop's residency in 1655. As a result, the Czech Protestant population shrank and the town became largely germanized.

In the 18th century, many Baroque building, which are today cultural monuments, were built. However the prosperity of the town suffered from the War of the Austrian Succession and the Seven Years' War.

20th century

In 1918, Bohemia, Moravia and Czech Silesia became constituent parts of the newly-created Czechoslovakia), along with a large border area inhabited predominantly by Sudeten Germans. Local Germans tried to join German Austria (which in turn aimed to join post-war Weimar Republic), but Czechoslovak troops prevented this. Known under the informal name of the Sudetenland, the region became the subject of political controversy in the following years. Czechs settled there again, but remained a minority. In 1938, after the Munich Agreement, German troops occupied the Sudetenland (and all the rest of Czech lands a few months later). The Czech population, which had grown to about 5,000 people, had to leave again.

Jews from Litoměřice were forced to flee to the Protectorate or were deported during the Holocaust in the Sudetenland. From March 1944 to May 1945, Leitmeritz concentration camp was located west of the town. 18,000 prisoners passed through the camp and were forced to work mostly on excavating underground factories (Richard I and II) under Radobýl. 4,500 died.

In the final stages of World War II, German troops retreated to escape the advancing Red Army. The Czech resistance took control of the castle on 27 April 1945, and after a few days they started negotiations with the German commander about the terms of his surrender. The Wehrmacht capitulated in the night after 8 May, but German troops fled on 9 May, just before Soviet troops entered the town on 10 May 1945. Most of the German population of the town was expelled by the Beneš decrees in August 1945, along with about 2.5 million other former Czechoslovak citizens of German ethnicity from the country.

Demographics

Economy
There are no large industrial enterprises located in Litoměřice. The largest employer is the hospital.

Litoměřice is known for viticulture and wine-making. It is the centre of the Litoměřická wine sub-region. The existence of vineyards is already documented in the first written mention of Litoměřice from 1057.

Religion
The town is the seat of the Roman Catholic Diocese of Litoměřice (part of Archdiocese of Prague), the 4th oldest (and 3rd still existing) Catholic diocese on present Czech territory.

Culture
Litoměřice is known for the annual event Zahrada Čech ("Garden of Bohemia"). It is an extensive horticultural trade fair, attended by tens of thousands of people.

North Bohemian Gallery of Fine Arts is based close the main square. Extensive collection spans from 13th century to contemporary art with numerous other exhibitions during the year. On the Mírové Square there is also the Gallery and Museum of Litoměřice diocese.

Sights

Since 1978, the historic centre of Litoměřice has been an urban monument reservation. The protected territory is delimited by remains of town walls. About  of town walls is preserved to this day. Originally they had four town gates, none of them is preserved. Part of the town fortifications was Litoměřice Castle. Today it contains an exposition of Czech viticulture.

Its core form Mírové Square, a large square with an area of about 2 hectares. Most of the houses on the square are in the Gothic style. The Old Town Hall building on the square is the oldest Renaissance building in the town. Today, the building serves as a regional museum. Other sights on the square include the "Chalice house" (new town hall with a lookout tower in the shape of chalice), Dům u černého orla ("Black Eagle House"; one of the most significant Renaissance houses), or Museum of Crystal Touch.

There are several valuable sacral buildings in Litoměřice. On the main square, there is the All Saints Church. Its existence was firstly mentioned in 1235. Originally it belonged to the town fortification. The Baroque Saint Stephen's Cathedral at the Dómské Square was built in place of an older Romanesque basilica in the years 1664–1668. The interior is almost completely authentic with main and six side altars and a lot of original paintings. Right next to the dome is a bishop's residence built in 1683–1701 by Giulio Broggio.

There is also the Jesuit Church of the Annunciation. It is a massive Baroque church built by Giulio and Octavio Broggio in 1701–1731.

There are numerous cellars connected by an extensive web of underground ways under the town. In some places, the cellars were built in three floors. Only  of these underground ways are open to the public.

Notable people

Master of the Litoměřice Altarpiece (c.1470–?), painter
Antonio Rosetti (c.1750–1792), composer and double bass player
Josef Jungmann (1773–1847), poet and linguist, lived and taught here
Vincent Bochdalek (1801–1883), anatomist and pathologist
Josef Emanuel Hilscher (1806–1837), Austrian soldier, poet and translator
Karel Hynek Mácha (1810–1836), poet, originally buried here
Ferdinand Blumentritt (1853–1913), Austrian teacher and ethnographer
Alfred Kubin (1877–1959), Austrian printmaker and illustrator
Štěpán Trochta (1905–1974), cardinal
Kurt Honolka (1913–1988),  German musicologist and music critic
Peter Lerche (1928–2016), German jurist
Johann Georg Reißmüller (1932–2018), German journalist
Dietrich Mattausch (born 1940), German actor
Rudolf Buchbinder (born 1946), Austrian classical pianist
Zdeněk Pecka (born 1954), rower
Jiří Macháček (born 1966), singer and actor
Milan Hnilička (born 1973), ice hockey player and politician
Martin Škoula (born 1979), ice hockey player
Oldřiška Marešová (born 1986), high jumper

Twin towns – sister cities

Litoměřice is twinned with:
 Armentières, France (2011)
 Calamba, Philippines (1974)
 Dapitan, Philippines (2006)
 Fulda, Germany (2001)
 Meissen, Germany (1996)

References

External links

 
 
Crystal Touch Museum

 
Cities and towns in the Czech Republic
Populated places in Litoměřice District
Populated places established in the 10th century
Populated riverside places in the Czech Republic
Populated places on the Elbe